Aglaia euryanthera is a species of plant in the family Meliaceae. It is found in Australia (Queensland), West Papua (Indonesia), and Papua New Guinea.

References

euryanthera
Sapindales of Australia
Flora of Western New Guinea
Flora of Papua New Guinea
Near threatened flora of Australia
Near threatened biota of Queensland
Flora of Queensland
Taxonomy articles created by Polbot